Urban Works Media is a South Korean artist management and production company. in December 29, 2022, it was announced that RBW acquired the company.

Works

Television programs

TV series

Current artists

Actors
 Lee Seo-young
 Lee Cho-ah
 Oh Jae-woong
 Seong Tae
 Son Ji-hyun

Singers
 V-HAWK

Former artists
 Cho Seung-hee
 Choi Kyu-hwan
 Choi Soo-han
 Choi Sun-il
 Gil Sang
 Han Seo-ul
 Hwang Seung-eon
 Kang Ji-sub
 Kim Eun-Soo
 Kim Jong-kook
 Kim Min-ju
 Lee Bit-na
 Shin So-i

References

External links
  

Television production companies of South Korea
Companies based in Seoul
Mass media companies established in 2009
2009 establishments in South Korea